Santhia is an upazila of Pabna District in the Division of Rajshahi, Bangladesh.

Geography
It has 46745 households and total area 331.56 km2. Santhia has some forest-like areas where there are wild animals like foxes, mongooses, wild cats etc. But these woods and animals are on the verge of extinction because of hunting and slash-and-burn.

Demographics
As of the 1991 Bangladesh census, Santhia has a population of 283463. Males constitute 52.2% of the population, and females 47.8%. This Upazila's eighteen up population is 135476.

Administration
Santhia Upazila is divided into Santhia Municipality and ten union parishads: Ataikola, Bhulbaria, Dhopadaha, Dhulauri, Gourigram, Karanja, Kashinathpur, Khatupara, Nagdemra, and Nandanpur. The union parishads are subdivided into 176 mauzas and 234 villages.

Santhia Municipality is subdivided into 9 wards and 27 mahallas.

Chairman:
01. Abdullah Al Mahmud Deloar

Vice Chairman:
01.Md Khokon

Woman Vice Chairman: 01. Selima Rahman Shila

Upazila Nirbahi Officer (UNO): Md. Abdur Razzaque Sarker 
Dr. Md. Aminul Islam Nasim, Physician

Municipality:

Chairman: Mahbubul Alam Bacchu
 
Councillors:
Md. Abdul Awoal 
Md. Saiful Alam
Md. Shirajul Islam
Md. Daud

See also
Upazilas of Bangladesh
Districts of Bangladesh
Divisions of Bangladesh

References

Upazilas of Pabna District